Deportivo Neza also known as Coyotes is a Mexican football team. The club was founded in 1978 when the city of Ciudad Neza bought the Club de Fútbol Laguna franchise. The club has played in various leagues in Mexico. The club played from 1978 to 1988 in the first division before the club was sold and moved to Tamaulipas and renamed Correcaminos UAT. The club has recently made its comeback in the Tercera División de México where they play in group 4.

History

Deportivo Neza was founded in 1978 when the city of Ciudad Neza bought the Club de Fútbol Laguna franchisee. The owners decided to change the club's colors to yellow and black from their original green and white. The club originally played in the city of Texcoco, Mexico State, where they had their best tournaments.

The club played its first game on September 17, 1978 against América match which they won 1-0 played in the stadium "10 de Diciembre".  The first goal was scored by Rito Sotelo in the 89th minute. The club had a terrible first year, finishing last with a record of 4-19-15 with 16 goals score and 35 goals allowed in 38 games for a total of 30 points. The club just managed to keep the category finishing a few points away from the relegated Veracruz.

In the 1979-80 season the club had its first qualification tournament finishing second in its group 6th overall with a record of 12-20-6 with 53 goals scored and 38 goals allowed in 38 games finishing with 44 points. In the first round the club played a short tournament in group 2 with clubs Cruz Azul, Atlante F.C. and Jaibos Tampico Madero the club played 6 matches, winning 2, tying 2, and losing 2, finished tied for 2nd place with Atlante F.C. failing to advance to the final.

In the 1980-81 season the club once again classified to the Championship Playoff after Finnish second once again in group 2 and 7 overall with a record of 13-15-10 scoring 42 goals and allowing 39 finish with 41 points. In the championship playoff series they were placed with C.D. Guadalajara, Atlético Español and Club Universidad Nacional.The club finished with 2 wins, 2 draws, and 2 losses, for a total of 6 points, 3 behind Club Universidad Nacional who eventually took the title, failing once again to reach the final.

The club played its last tournament in the first division in the 1987-88 season tournament. The club was placed in group 3 along with clubs Club América, Puebla F.C. and Deportivo Irapuato and Necaxa. The club finished 4th with a record of 12-11-15 scoring 46 goals and allowing 60 with a total of 35 points 3 behind Puebla F.C. who obtain the last playoff spot. At the end of the season with financial problems and lack of fan support the club was sold and transferred to Tamaulipas and remained Correcaminos UAT a local university.

In the 1990s the city try to bring back the club but fail in its attempt and so a new club was formed Toros Neza which played in the same stadium as Coyotes had played. Toros played in the Second division in 1993 and ended winning that championship earning a chance to play in the first division where they played from 1993-2002.Recently the club has made its return playing in the Tercera División de México trying to once again be part of the 18 clubs in first division.

Historic badges

Historic badges

Primera División de México Statistics 

All statistics from the club's play in the Primera División de México from 1978-1989.

 GP - Games Played
 W - WINS
 E - Draws
 P - Loss
 GS - Goals Score
 GA - Goals Allowed
 Pts - Points
 DIF - Difference

Past Kits

First kit evolution

See also
 Club de Fútbol Laguna
 Correcaminos UAT
Tercera División de México
Primera División de México
Toros Neza

Footnotes

Football clubs in the State of Mexico
Association football clubs established in 1978
1978 establishments in Mexico